Odile Defraye (14 July 1888 – 21 August 1965) was a Belgian road racing cyclist who won three stages and the overall title of the 1912 Tour de France, which was the last tour decided by a points system instead of overall best time. He was the first Belgian to win the Tour and was only invited to join Alcyon's all-French team at a late stage for publicity purposes.

In the 1913 Tour de France, Defraye held the overall lead after stages 2 through 5 before relinquishing the lead on the Tourmalet to Stage 6 and eventual winner Philippe Thys. He participated in six tours between 1909 and 1924 but his victory Tour was the only one that he completed.

Other major wins include the 1913 Milan–San Remo, a one-day classic, and four stages and the overall for the 1912 Tour of Belgium.

Career achievements

Major results

1908
 Tour of Flanders (Amateur edition)
1910
 Winner Championship of Flanders
1911
  Belgian National Road Race Championships
1912
 Winner Tour of Belgium
 Stage 2
 Stage 3
 Stage 6
 Stage 7
Winner Tour de France
 Stage 2
 Stage 7
 Stage 9
1913
 Milan–San Remo
1921
 Tour of Belgium
Stage 6

Grand Tour results timeline

References

1888 births
1965 deaths
People from Roeselare
Belgian male cyclists
Tour de France winners
Belgian Tour de France stage winners
Cyclists from West Flanders